Eric Smith (born September 17, 1964 in Ottawa) is a Canadian sprint canoer who competed in the mid to late 1980s. Competing in two Summer Olympics, he earned his best finish of fifth in the C-2 500 m event at Los Angeles in 1984.

He attended the University of Western Ontario.

References

Sports-Reference.com profile

1964 births
Sportspeople from Ottawa
Canadian male canoeists
Canoeists at the 1984 Summer Olympics
Canoeists at the 1988 Summer Olympics
Living people
Olympic canoeists of Canada
University of Western Ontario alumni